Starkovo is a rural locality and the administrative center of Starkovsky Selsoviet Rural Settlement, Oktyabrsky District, Kursk Oblast, Russia. Population:

Geography 
The village is located on the Sukhaya Rogozna River (a left tributary of the Rogozna in the Seym River basin), 78 km from the Russia–Ukraine border, 20 km west of Kursk, 11 km north-west of the district center – the urban-type settlement Pryamitsyno.

 Climate
Starkovo has a warm-summer humid continental climate (Dfb in the Köppen climate classification).

Transport 
Starkovo is located 15.5 km from the federal route  Crimea Highway (a part of the European route ), 12 km from the road of regional importance  (Kursk – Lgov – Rylsk – border with Ukraine), on the road of intermunicipal significance  (Dyakonovo – Starkovo – Sokolovka), 13.5 km from the nearest railway station Dyakonovo (railway line Lgov I — Kursk).

The rural locality is situated 29 km from Kursk Vostochny Airport, 132 km from Belgorod International Airport and 232 km from Voronezh Peter the Great Airport.

References

Notes

Sources

Rural localities in Oktyabrsky District, Kursk Oblast